Nefertite Nguvu is a writer, director, and producer and founder of the production company Hollywood Africans. Her multiple award-winning first feature film, In the Morning , was shot in eight days. Shadow and Act said of In the Morning, “Nguvu crafts each relationship and character as its own poem, evoking a certain emotion that is elevated by the cinematography of renowned image-maker Arthur Jafa.” She created her short film, The Last Two Lovers at the End of the World with AT&T Hello Lab.

References

African-American film directors
American women film directors
Year of birth missing (living people)
Living people
21st-century African-American people
21st-century African-American women